Milford Township is a township in Story County, Iowa, USA.  As of the 2000 census, its population was 569.

Geography
According to the USGS, it contains four cemeteries: Brouhard Cemetery, Evergreen Memory Gardens, Knoll Cemetery and Pleasant Grove Cemetery.

 Interstate 35 runs north and south through the township and County Road E29 runs east–west.

Story County maintains McFarland Park which is a  area located in northwest Milford Township. Visitors can explore a variety of ecotypes including tallgrass prairie, woodland, and stream habitats. The park has  of trails that are open to hiking and off-road biking, but interior trails with stairs are closed to bicyclists.  The park includes a  lake stocked with bluegill, bass, and catfish. Winter activities include ice fishing and cross-country skiing.

References
 USGS Geographic Names Information System (GNIS)
 Story County McFarland Park

External links
 US-Counties.com
 City-Data.com

Townships in Story County, Iowa
Townships in Iowa